Amal Ayouch (born 1966) is a Moroccan actress who since the late 1990s has performed in the French language both on stage and, above all, in film. In January 2015, she was honoured with an award at the African Women's Film Festival in Brazzaville. Ayouch has played a leading role in Morocco's Fondation des arts vivants (Living Arts Foundation).

Biography
Born in Casablanca in 1966, Amal Ayouch showed interest in acting from an early age, performing on stage at high school. When she was 18, she arrived in Montpellier where she studied to become a pharmacist. While at university, in 1987 she joined a theatre group attached to the French literature department.

She began her film career thanks to another pharmacist, Hassan Benjelloun, who gave her an important part in Les Amis d'hier (1998). Soon afterwards, Hakim Noury invited her to star in Destin de Femme together with Rachid El Ouali. Playing a woman who refused to submit to a difficult husband, she contributed to the film's success.

In 1999, she agreed to play a woman of loose morals in Ali Zaoua directed by her cousin Nabil Ayouch. Similar roles followed in Farida Belyazid's Casablanca, Casablanca (2002) and Chassan Benjelloun's Les lèvres du silence (2001) and Farida Belyazid's Casablanca, Casablanca (2002). She went on to star in Driss Chouika's Le jeu de l'amour (2006), allowing her to master a difficult role in intimate scenes with Younes Megri. She has also played in other successful films including Les Anges de Satan (2007).

She appeared in two films directed by Nabil Lahlou, Les années de l'exil (2001) and Tabite or not Tabite (2004). It was also Lahlou who encouraged her to act on the stage, inviting her to appear in his theatrical productions, including Ophélie n’est pas Morte, Les Tortues, Antigone, and En Attendant Godot.

Filmography

Cinéma

References

1966 births
People from Casablanca
Moroccan film actresses
Moroccan stage actresses
Moroccan television actresses
Living people